Joyce Fátima Marie Jacobi Samudio (born 1988, David, Chiriqui) is a Panamanian model and Panamanian beauty queen. She was elected Miss Panamá international 2009 this gave her the opportunity to compete in the Miss International 2009 pageant which was held in Chengdu, Sichuan, China. finally she was in the top 15.

Pageant participations
In the 2009 participate in the contest Bellezas Panamá 2009 on Jun 17, 2009 win the title and crowned by Alejandra Arias Miss International Panamá 2008.

Joyce also participated in the Reina Hispanoamericana 2009 Beauty Pageant was held in Parque Urbano, in Santa Cruz, Bolivia on October 29, 2009. She was unplaced.

Jacobi represent Panamá  in the Miss International 2009 in Chengdu, China finals was held on November 28, 2009, at Sichuan International Tennis Center, Chengdu, Sichuan, China. She was in the top 15.

References

Miss International 2009 delegates
Living people
Panamanian beauty pageant winners
Señorita Panamá
1988 births